Jan Jeník (born 15 September 2000) is a Czech professional ice hockey centre for the Tucson Roadrunners of the American Hockey League (AHL) as a prospect to the Arizona Coyotes of the National Hockey League (NHL). He was selected 65th overall in the 2018 NHL Entry Draft by the Arizona Coyotes.

Playing career
On 29 March 2019, Jeník was signed to a three-year, entry-level contract with the Coyotes.

Following his second season in the Ontario Hockey League with the Hamilton Bulldogs, and with the 2020–21 North American season delayed due to the COVID-19 pandemic, Jeník was loaned by the Coyotes to Finnish second-tier club, Imatran Ketterä of the Mestis, until the commencement of NHL training camp on 28 October 2020.

Career statistics

Regular season and playoffs

International

References

External links
 

2000 births
Living people
Arizona Coyotes draft picks
Arizona Coyotes players
Czech ice hockey centres
HC Benátky nad Jizerou players
HC Bílí Tygři Liberec players
Imatran Ketterä players
People from Nymburk
Tucson Roadrunners players
Sportspeople from the Central Bohemian Region
Czech expatriate ice hockey players in Canada
Czech expatriate ice hockey players in Finland
Czech expatriate ice hockey players in the United States